Mohamed Mamoun Eisa (born 12 July 1994) is a Sudanese professional footballer who plays as a forward for  club Milton Keynes Dons.

Early life
Born in Khartoum, Sudan, Eisa's family moved to Camden, London when he was nine years old.

Career

Early career
After playing with the Pro Touch Soccer Academy, Eisa had unsuccessful trials at Norwich City, Southend United and Oxford United. He spent his early career in non-league football with Dartford, Leatherhead, VCD Athletic, Corinthian and Greenwich Borough. At Greenwich he scored 57 goals in 100 appearances in all competitions before leaving the club in June 2017.

Cheltenham Town
He signed for Cheltenham Town on 7 July 2017 on an initial one-year deal. After breaking into the first-team, in August 2017 Eisa signed a contract extension with the club until 2020. On 24 March 2018, Eisa equalled Cheltenham's record for 20 league goals in a season. On 6 April 2018, Eisa won the EFL League Two Player Of The Month Award.

During the 2017–18 season he scored 25 goals for Cheltenham Town in all competitions, including 23 in EFL League Two. His goalscoring saw him break Cheltenham's record for the most goals scored in a season. In April 2018 he was nominated for the EFL League Two Player of the Season award. At the club's end of season award, Eisa won the Supporters' Player Of The Year, Players' Player Of The Year and the Sponsors' Player Of The Year awards.

Bristol City
During the 2018 pre-season he was linked with a transfer to Brentford, Leeds United and Portsmouth. He signed for Bristol City on 23 July 2018. He made six appearances for the club.

Peterborough United
On 1 June 2019, Eisa signed a four-year deal with League One club Peterborough United for an undisclosed, club record fee. By 22 November 2019 he had scored 12 of Peterborough's 39 league goals. On 11 May 2021 he was made available for transfer by Peterborough.

Milton Keynes Dons
On 20 July 2021, Eisa joined League One club Milton Keynes Dons for an undisclosed but reportedly club-record transfer fee, signing a long-term deal. He scored his first goal for the club on his league debut in a 3–3 away fixture against Bolton Wanderers on 7 August 2021. On 16 April 2022, Eisa suffered a serious injury during a 3–2 home defeat to Sheffield Wednesday, which ruled him out for the remainder of the season and beyond. During his first season with the club he scored 12 goals in 41 appearances in all competitions.

Personal life
He has four brothers, one of whom, Abo, is also a professional footballer. Abo has said that Mohamed has been a role model to him. A younger brother Omar is also a footballer.

Career statistics

Honours
Individual
EFL League Two Player of the Month: March 2018
Cheltenham Town Player of the Year: 2017–18.
Cheltenham Town Players' Player of the Year: 2017–18.

References

1994 births
Living people
Sudanese footballers
Dartford F.C. players
Leatherhead F.C. players
VCD Athletic F.C. players
Corinthian F.C. (Kent) players
Greenwich Borough F.C. players
Cheltenham Town F.C. players
Bristol City F.C. players
English Football League players
National League (English football) players
Isthmian League players
Association football forwards
Sudanese expatriate footballers
Sudanese expatriate sportspeople in England
Expatriate footballers in England
Peterborough United F.C. players
Milton Keynes Dons F.C. players